Yaakov Mutzafi ( Ya'aqov Muṣafi; 1899 - May 25, 1983) was a rabbi and kabbalist. The last spiritual leader of the ancient Jewish community of Iraq, he moved to Israel ahead of the Jewish masses when they were finally airlifted there in 1952.

An anti-Zionist, in his later years Mutzafi served as the Av Beth Din of the Sephardi Edah HaHaredith, and rabbi of the Shemesh Sedaqah Synagogue in Jerusalem.

Early life and marriage 
Yaakov Mutzafi was born in Baghdad, Ottoman Iraq, the son of Ezra Mutzafi and Mazal Tov. He received an early Torah education from his grandfather, Moshe Mutzafi, and his primary education at Midrash Talmud Torah alongside his life-long friend and colleague Silman Mutzafi. For his secondary education, Mutzafi was enrolled at Midrash Bet Zilkha, where he received instruction from Ephraim HaCohen, Shimon Agassi, and Sadqa Hussein, the latter with whom Mutzafi would share a lifetime of collaboration. He was later to be the student of Yehuda Fatiyah.

Mutzafi married the daughter of Sasson Dangour, founder of Yeshivath Dorshei Torah, where he would subsequently continue his studies alongside Silman Hugi Aboudi.

Final years in Iraq 

During the late 1930s, the British-backed Kingdom of Iraq was coming under increased pressure from pro-German Arab nationalists who were constantly agitating against the royal government, with Jews and other minorities caught in the middle.

The building political pressure boiled over into a bloody pogrom against the Jews in Baghdad on June 1–2, 1941, which became known as the farhud. Over 180 Jews were killed, with many more injured in the violence. Mutzafi raced to open up the gates of Midrash Bet Zilkha to the surviving Jews who were evicted from their homes, and arranged for their upkeep via donations received from philanthropists in the community.

Move to Jerusalem 

With the tumultuous years of World War II over, the long history of the Jews in Iraq was entering its final phase. With the founding of the new state of Israel, Jewish life in the Arab world was becoming more precarious by the day. Although he spent countless hours tending to the spiritual needs of the community, Mutzafi reasoned that there could be no viable future left for the Jews in Iraq. He had previously spent one month visiting with his former teacher Sadqa Hussein in Jerusalem, and in 1950 he finally moved there. He immediately took up scholarly residence at Shemesh Sedaqah Synagogue, where he was to serve as hazzan and rosh yeshiva, at first under the wing of his master. Upon the latter's death in 1961, Mutzafi inherited the full mantle of spiritual leadership of the transplanted community in Israel. Mutzafi could be seen, adorned in jellabiya and fez, giving council and administering blessings to Jews of various persuasions in the Beit Yisrael neighborhood.

Politics 
Mutzafi served as Av Beth Din of the Sephardi Edah HaHaredith, an organization more closely associated with the anti-Zionist rabbis of the Ashkenazi Old yishuv. Mutzafi shared the same beliefs as his fellows in the Edah regarding their disassociation from the Israeli government, most notably regarding the ban on taking part in elections to the Knesset, even encouraging participation in Neturei Karta demonstrations.

Death 
Yaakov Mutzafi died in 1983, at the age of 83. He was buried at the Mount of Olives Jewish Cemetery.

Legacy 
Mutzafi was a mentor to Rishon LeZion Mordechai Eliyahu.
The Jerusalem Municipality named a street in the Ramat Shlomo neighborhood in East Jerusalem after Mutzafi, as did the city of Beitar Illit.

See also 

Yitzhak Kaduri

References

External links 
Photograph of Yaakov Mutzafi, Breslev-midot.com
Kabbalists in Action: Rabbi Yaakov Mutzafi, Lecture by Rabbi Yosef Mizrahi; Youtube.com

1899 births
1983 deaths
Rabbis from Baghdad
20th-century Iraqi rabbis
20th-century rabbis in Jerusalem
Sephardic Haredi rabbis in Israel
Kabbalists
Iraqi emigrants to Israel
Anti-Zionist Haredi rabbis
Burials at the Jewish cemetery on the Mount of Olives